Mahra Al-Hinaai (born 23 August 2001) is an Emirati female ju-jitsu practitioner. She represented United Arab Emirates at the 2018 Asian Games and settled for a silver medal in the women's 49kg ne-waza event after losing to fellow teenager Jessa Khan of Cambodia.

References 

2001 births
Living people
Emirati female martial artists
Ju-jitsu practitioners at the 2018 Asian Games
Medalists at the 2018 Asian Games
Asian Games silver medalists for the United Arab Emirates
Asian Games medalists in ju-jitsu
21st-century Emirati women